Tural Safguliyev (born 14 January 1991) is an Azerbaijani judoka.

He is the bronze medallist of the 2018 Judo Grand Prix Antalya in the -90 kg category.

References

External links
 

1991 births
Living people
Azerbaijani male judoka
21st-century Azerbaijani people
20th-century Azerbaijani people